Rubén Pardo Gutiérrez (born 22 October 1992) is a Spanish professional footballer who plays for CD Leganés as a central midfielder.

He spent the vast majority of his career at Real Sociedad, making 194 official appearances and also being loaned to Betis. In January 2020, he signed with Bordeaux.

Pardo earned 31 caps for Spain at youth level, winning the 2011 European Under-19 championship.

Club career

Real Sociedad
Pardo was born in Logroño, La Rioja. He made his senior debut in the 2009–10 season, appearing for Real Sociedad's reserves in the Tercera División and helping them to achieve promotion.

On 29 October 2011, Pardo made his debut for the first team, coming on as a substitute for Markel Bergara in the last minutes of a 0–1 La Liga home defeat against Real Madrid. He scored his first goal for the Txuriurdin on 13 February of the following year in a 2–0 victory over Sevilla FC also at Anoeta Stadium, and finished the campaign with 17 appearances in all competitions.

In 2013–14, Pardo missed only three games and contributed three goals, including one to conclude the 2–0 home defeat of Athletic Bilbao in the Basque derby on 5 January 2014. His form led to speculation of a transfer to Manchester United, which he played down; on 9 May, he renewed his contract with Real Sociedad until 2018.

Pardo was loaned to fellow league club Real Betis in January 2017, for the remainder of the season. He made his debut on the 29th, starting in a 1–1 home draw against reigning champions FC Barcelona.

Bordeaux
On 31 January 2020, Pardo signed a two-and-a-half-year deal with FC Girondins de Bordeaux. His maiden appearance in the French Ligue 1 took place on 5 February, when he featured 30 minutes in the 1–1 away draw with Stade Brestois 29 after replacing Jimmy Briand. Eighteen days later he scored for the first time for his new team, coming off the bench at the interval and netting the last goal of a 4–3 loss at leaders Paris Saint-Germain FC.

Leganés
Pardo returned to Spain on 28 September 2020, after agreeing to a one-year loan at CD Leganés in the second division. On 28 August of the following year, he joined the club on a permanent two-year contract.

International career
Pardo was part of Spain's squad in the 2009 UEFA European Under-17 Football Championship, although he only played in one game, as a substitute against France. He was selected by the under-18 team for the unofficial 2010 Copa del Atlántico, which his country won.

Pardo featured in every match at the 2011 European Under-19 Championship, helping the national side conquer the tournament in Romania.

Honours
Spain U19
UEFA European Under-19 Championship: 2011

References

External links

1992 births
Living people
Sportspeople from Logroño
Spanish footballers
Footballers from La Rioja (Spain)
Association football midfielders
La Liga players
Segunda División players
Segunda División B players
Real Sociedad B footballers
Real Sociedad footballers
Real Betis players
CD Leganés players
Ligue 1 players
FC Girondins de Bordeaux players
Spain youth international footballers
Spain under-21 international footballers
Spanish expatriate footballers
Expatriate footballers in France
Spanish expatriate sportspeople in France